The Gunggari, or Kunggari, are an Aboriginal Australian people of southern Queensland. They are to be distinguished from the Kuungkari.

Country

Language 

They speak the Gunggari language, a member of the Maric language family. Their language is closely related to, and sometimes considered a dialect of neighbouring Bidjara and Manandanji languages.

History of contact
As white pastoralists began to seize and develop properties, the neighbouring Mandandanji began to be absorbed into the Gunggari, as the latter moved eastwards.

Social Organisation
According to information supplied by James Lalor to Alfred William Howitt, the Gunggari clan names were as follows:
 Urgilla. Totem =  Ngorgu (Kangaroo)
 Anbeir.  Totem = Bondun (Bandicoot)
 Wango. Totems =(a)Tonga (opossum) (b)Bulbora (flying fox)
 Ubur.   Totems = (a) Tambool (Brown snake) (b)Abboia (lizard)

Native title 
The Gunggari people received a positive determination of native title in 2012. This is now administered by the Gunggari Native Title Aboriginal Corporation (GNTAC), a Registered Native Title Body Corporate (RNTBC). More information on native title in Australia and Gunggari land and culture is available at the GNTAC website.

Alternative names

 Congaro
 Coongurri
 Gungari, Gunggari, Goongarree
 Kogai (language name)
 Kogurre
 Kungeri
 Kungri
 Ngaragari. (Koamu word for the tongue spoken between Bollon and Nebine Creek)
 Unggari
 Unggri, Unghi
 Ungorri

Notes

Citations

Sources

Aboriginal peoples of Queensland